The Ruta del Tambor y el Bombo (literally "Drum and Bass Drum Route") is a celebration of Easter and the Passion of Christ that takes place in nine towns in south-eastern Aragon (Spain), in the province of Teruel: Albalate del Arzobispo, Alcañiz, Alcorisa, Andorra, Calanda, Híjar, la Puebla de Híjar, Samper de Calanda and Urrea de Gaén. During Easter, a number of residents of those towns wear a special tunic and play either the drum or the bass drum at specified moments, also marching during processions. The combination of all the drums playing simultaneously creates a remarkably loud din.

The tradition establishes that all drum players must start playing at the same time at a certain moment, emulating the tremor after Jesus death. This beginning is called "Rompida de la hora" (literally, Breaking the hour) and starts in almost every village on Maundy Thursday at 12 pm immediately after special signaling in the Town Hall Square (except in Calanda, where it's at 12 noon on Good Friday). There is also an established moment, in Easter Saturday, at which drum playing must stop. Each town has its own drum rolls and a different color for their tunics.

This tradition might originate from some ancient ceremony, or more probably from the Middle Ages, when knights of the military orders could have brought the two percussion instruments to the land. The tradition became famous thanks to the filmmaker Luis Buñuel (a native from Calanda), who included images of it in some of his films.

Until the 1980s, men were the only ones who could play the drums in some of the towns. From that date, women have gradually incorporated.

This celebration was declared of National Tourist Interest in Spain in November 2005. Except in the town of Híjar, declared in 1980, 25 years earlier than any other town in the route. On June 6, 2014, the Ministry of Industry and Tourism declared the Ruta del Tambor y el Bombo as Festival of International Tourist Interest.

References

Festivals in Spain
Easter traditions